The prytaneis (πρυτάνεις; sing.: πρύτανις prytanis) were the executives of the boule of ancient Athens.

Origins and organization
The term (like basileus or tyrannos) is probably of Pre-Greek etymology (possibly cognate to Etruscan (e)prθni).

When Cleisthenes reorganized the Athenian government in 508/7 BCE, he replaced the old Solonian boule, or council, of 400 with a new boule of 500.  The old boule consisted of 100 members of each of the four ancestral tribes.  Cleisthenes created ten new tribes and made the boule consist of 50 men from each of these tribes.  Each tribe's delegation would be an executive of the boule for one-tenth of the year, so that ten groups of prytaneis served each year, a position granted by sortition. The executive officers were known as prytaneis and their term of office as a prytany (πρυτανία).

Duties
The prytaneis served every day during their prytany.  They formally called to meeting the full boule and the ecclesia of Athens, though in practice many meetings were mandatory and evidence suggests that persuasive individuals could enjoin the prytaneis to call or not to call a supplementary meeting.  The prytaneis received ambassadors from foreign states and generally conducted the day-to-day business of the state.  They ate at public expense in the Tholos, a circular edifice constructed for them next to the boule house.

Each day, for one 24-hour period, one member of the 50 prytaneis was selected by lot to serve as the foreman (ἐπιστάτης epistates, "caretaker").  He administered the state seal and the keys to the state treasuries and archives.  He was, in effect, the chief executive officer of Athens.  No man was allowed to hold this office more than once, and so probably more than half of all adult male Athenians held it, at one time or another.

During meetings of the ecclesia or boule, the current foreman also chaired these meetings.  In the Fourth Century, this practice changed and the chairmanship of meetings was taken over by an office specifically created for this task (the πρόεδροι proedroi).

In other cities
Prytanis as a title is used in other ancient Greek cities including Rhodes, Alexandria and other cities along the west coast of Asia Minor.  Offices that use this title usually have responsibility for presiding over councils of some kind. In the city of Miletus, the prytanis had enough power that he was able to become a tyrannos (Aristotle Politics V.5, 1305a17).

References

Sources
Hansen, Mogens H. The Athenian Democracy in the Age of Demosthenes: Structure, Principles and Ideology. Oxford: Blackwell Publishing, 1991.
Rhodes, P. J. The Athenian Boule. Oxford: Clarendon Press, 1972.
Hignett, Charles. A History of the Athenian Constitution. Oxford, 1962. 

Ancient Greek law
Ancient Greek titles
Ancient Athenian titles
Athenian democracy